A cavallo della tigre is an Italian film written and directed by Luigi Comencini in 1961. It was released as Jailbreak in the United Kingdom and On the Tiger's Back in the United States. In 2002 the film was remade. Giuseppe Mazzacurati directed and Fabrizio Bentivoglio starred in the new version.

Cast
Nino Manfredi as Giacinto Rossi
Mario Adorf as Tagliabue
Valeria Moriconi as Ileana Rossi
Gian Maria Volonté as Papaleo
Raymond Bussières as Il Sorcio
Luciana Buzzanca as Olga
Ferruccio De Ceresa as Coppola
Vincenzo Fortunati
Ferdinando Gerra
Franco Giacobini as prison's doctor
Franco Morici
Serge Reggiani
Irina Brigenti

References

External links

1961 films
1961 comedy films
Italian black-and-white films
Films directed by Luigi Comencini
Films scored by Piero Umiliani
1960s Italian-language films
Italian prison films
Titanus films
Films with screenplays by Age & Scarpelli
Italian comedy films
1960s Italian films